Matthew Puccini (born ) is an American filmmaker. He is known for his short films that deal with LGBT-related subject matters. These include The Mess He Made (2017), Marquise (2018), Dirty (2020) and Lavender (2019). His films have played at several festivals including Sundance, SXSW, Aspen Shortsfest, Palm Springs ShortsFest, and Outfest Los Angeles. His work has also been featured on Topic and The Huffington Post.

Life and career
Puccini grew up in the San Francisco Bay Area. In 2015, while attending New York University's Tisch School of the Arts, he made his first film as writer and director, Solo, which starred Tommy Nelson and Matthew Mindler. It earned Puccini the King Award for Screenwriting at NYU’s First Run Film Festival and won the 2017 Golden Reel Award for Best Student Film at the Tiburon International Film Festival.

After graduating from NYU in 2017, Puccini made his next film, The Mess He Made, which showed the experience of waiting for the results of an HIV test through the eyes of a man, played by Max Jenkins. The film premiered at SXSW in 2017, where it became a finalist for the Iris Prize. That same year, Puccini became a member of the 2017 New York Film Festival Artist Academy, a Richie Jackson Fellow at Tisch School of the Arts and a Creative Culture Fellow at the Jacob Burns Film Center. He then produced two more short films, Stumped and Marquise, the latter of which was acquired for streaming by Topic Studios.

In 2018, Puccini was named a Sundance Ignite Fellow. He created a Kickstarter campaign to fund Lavender, which he then produced later that year, starring Michael Hsu Rosen, Ken Barnett and Michael Urie. The film premiered at the 2019 Sundance Film Festival and was nominated for both the festival's Short Film Grand Jury Prize and Vimeo’s Best Drama of 2019, and won the Here Media Award for Best Queer Short Film at the Provincetown International Film Festival. Its distribution rights were acquired by Fox Searchlight Pictures after its Sundance premiere.

In 2020, his next film, Dirty premiered at the 2020 Sundance Film Festival and was nominated for the Jury Award for Best Short Film. The film was screened virtually at SXSW due to the COVID-19 pandemic, where it was nominated for the Grand Jury Award for Narrative Short and received a Special Jury Award for Acting. It then went on to play at BFI Flare, Outfest Fusion, Atlanta Film Festival and the Palm Springs ShortsFest. In October 2020, the film's streaming rights were acquired by The Criterion Channel.

Puccini lives in Los Angeles.

Filmography

Awards and nominations

Film festival awards

References

External links

 Matthew Puccini Mubi
Matthew Puccini website

American film producers
American male screenwriters
American film editors
LGBT film directors
American LGBT screenwriters
American gay writers
New York University alumni
Tisch School of the Arts alumni
Film directors from New York (state)
Film directors from San Francisco
People from San Francisco
People from Brooklyn
1990s births
Living people
Year of birth uncertain